Hart Udy (27 July 1857 – 6 August 1933) was a New Zealand rugby union player. A forward, Udy represented Wellington at a provincial level, and was a member of the first ever New Zealand national side, which toured Australia and won every game, in 1884. He played eight matches on the tour. He did not play any full test matches as New Zealand did not play their first until 1903. He was the Wellington selector from 1884 to 1885.

A cousin, Dan Udy, represented New Zealand in 1901 and 1903.

References

1857 births
1933 deaths
People from Greytown, New Zealand
New Zealand international rugby union players
New Zealand rugby union players
New Zealand blacksmiths
Rugby union forwards
Wellington rugby union players
Rugby union players from the Wellington Region